Jane Blaffer Owen (April 18, 1915 – June 21, 2010) was a patron of the arts, author, and heir to the Humble Oil fortune (a predecessor of Exxon-Mobil). She and her husband, Kenneth Dale Owen, helped resettle the community of New Harmony, Indiana north of Evansville, Indiana. She commissioned the Roofless Church. She received the Sachem Award in 2007. She wrote New Harmony, Indiana: Like a River, Not a Lake: A Memoir.

Blaffer was born in Houston. She studied at The Kinkaid School and then Ethel Walker School in Connecticut. She went on to Bryn Mawr College, Washington School of Diplomacy, and the Union Theological Seminary. Her husband is a descendant of Utopian industrialist Robert Owen.

She trained as a dancer. She supported the work of many architects and artists. She also funded the University of Houston's Blaffer Art Museum.

She received the Louise Dupont Crowninshield Award from the National Trust for Historic Preservation in 2008 for her work on New Harmony and received an honorary doctorate from Purdue University in 2008.

She was survived by her daughters Jane and Anne Dale Owen and her sister.

References

External links

Interview with Jane Blaffer Owen from the Archives of American Art

1915 births
2010 deaths
People from New Harmony, Indiana
People from Houston
Bryn Mawr College alumni
American women philanthropists
20th-century American philanthropists
21st-century philanthropists
American art collectors
20th-century women philanthropists
21st-century women philanthropists